Jay Anthony Lynch (born 31 March 1993) is an English professional footballer who plays as a goalkeeper for  club Fleetwood Town.

Career

Early career
Lynch started his career playing youth team football for Manchester United before joining Bolton Wanderers in 2010. After playing for the club's under-18 side, he moved to the under-21 side, and was named on the bench for three Premier League games in the 2011–12 season, including against former club Manchester United. He was released by the club in June 2014 after his contract expired.

Accrington Stanley
In August 2014 Lynch signed for Accrington Stanley on non-contract terms. He made his debut as a substitute against Shrewsbury Town after starting goalkeeper Luke Simpson was sent off. In September he was released by mutual consent, having complained using his Twitter account at the lack of chances he had received, saying "talent counts for nothing nowadays, it's all politics and finances".

Salford City
He subsequently joined Salford City, making his debut on 6 September in a match against Spennymoor Town. He left the club in May 2017.

Fylde
Lynch joined newly promoted National League side Fylde in June 2017, signing a two-year contract. He cited the clubs' "top-class" facilities and the need for a new challenge as his reasons for signing. In 2019, he was named the National League's goalkeeper of the year, and started at Wembley Stadium as Fylde lost 3–0 to Salford in the 2019 National League play-off Final.

Rochdale
On 19 August 2019, Lynch joined League One club Rochdale on a free transfer, signing a two-year deal. He had previously turned down a new deal with AFC Fylde.

On 19 June 2021, Lynch signed a new one-year contract.

Fleetwood Town
On 13 June 2022, Lynch agreed to join Fleetwood Town on a two-year deal upon the expiration of his contract with Rochdale.

Career statistics

Honours
AFC Fylde
FA Trophy: 2018–19

References

External links

1993 births
Living people
Footballers from Salford
English footballers
Association football goalkeepers
Bolton Wanderers F.C. players
Accrington Stanley F.C. players
Salford City F.C. players
AFC Fylde players
Rochdale A.F.C. players
Fleetwood Town F.C. players
English Football League players
Northern Premier League players
National League (English football) players